is a railway station on the Hakodate Main Line in Otaru, Hokkaido, Japan, operated by the Hokkaido Railway Company (JR Hokkaido). The station is numbered "S13".

Lines
 
 
Otaru-Chikkō Station is served by the Hakodate Main Line.

Station layout
The station has one island platform serving two tracks. The station has automated ticket machines, automated turnstiles which accept Kitaca, and a "Midori no Madoguchi" staffed ticket office.

Platforms

Adjacent stations

History
Otaru-Chikkō Station opened on 21 November 1910. With the privatization of Japanese National Railways (JNR) on 1 April 1987, the station came under the control of JR Hokkaido.

Surrounding area
Otaru-Chikkō Station is connected to the Wing Bay Otaru shopping mall and the Grand Park Hotel Otaru via a pedestrian footbridge.
 Wing Bay Otaru
 Grand Park Otaru

See also
 List of railway stations in Japan

References

External links

 Station map 

Railway stations in Otaru
Railway stations in Japan opened in 1910